Youssef Ibrahim Sarraf, (October 5, 1940–December 31, 2009) was the second bishop of the Chaldean Catholic Eparchy of Cairo, Egypt.

Born in Cairo, Sarraf was ordained to the priesthood on December 19. 1964. On February 6, 1984, Sarraf was appointed bishop of the Eparchy of Cairo and was ordained on May 13, 1984.

Notes 

1940 births
2009 deaths
Chaldean bishops
20th-century Eastern Catholic bishops
21st-century Eastern Catholic bishops